Jordi Carchano (born 2 July 1984 in Sant Quirze del Vallès, Catalonia Spain) is a motorcycle road racer.

Career statistics

By season

Races by year
(key) (Races in bold indicate pole position)

References 

1984 births
Living people
Motorcycle racers from Catalonia
Spanish motorcycle racers